Perbadanan Bekalan Air Pulau Pinang Football Club is a Malaysian football team based in the city of Penang representing the state of Pulau Pinang, Malaysia. 

Founded in 2012, the team was registered under the name of the Perbadanan Bekalan Air Pulau Pinang Football Club (Malay: Kelab Bolasepak Perbadanan Bekalan Air Pulau Pinang) and play in the third-tier football league system in Malaysia, the Malaysia FAM League in the 2012 season.

During the 2013 season, the club finished second in the league and were promoted to the 2014 Malaysia Premier League. After just a season, the club were relegated back to the Malaysia FAM League after finished at the bottom of the table during their debut season. After the end of 2015 season, the club has withdrawn from the league and officially dissolved on 2016.

Stadiums
The Negeri Pulau Pinang Stadium is the home stadium of PBAPP FC. The stadium has a capacity of 40,000 people. It was built in 2000. The stadium has been built to host the 8th Sukma Games (Malaysian Games) in 2000.

Previously, PBAPP FC also play in City Stadium in Georgetown.

Kit manufacturers and shirt sponsors

Squad

Current squad
As of 29 May 2015. Since the club has been dissolved on 2016, all players have been released to join another club

Current coaching staff

Coaches
 Zabidi Hassan (2012–2013)
 Yunus Alif (2013–)

Achievement
 Malaysia FAM League
 Winners (0):
 ''Runners-up (1): 2013

References

External links
 PBAPP FC at Facebook
 PBAPP F.C. Website
 PBA Website

Football clubs in Malaysia
Defunct football clubs in Malaysia
Works association football clubs in Malaysia